Hiram Rafael Cancio (August 26, 1920 – December 16, 2008) was a United States district judge of the United States District Court for the District of Puerto Rico.

Education and career

Born Hiram Rafael Cancio Vilella in San Sebastian, Puerto Rico, Cancio received a Bachelor of Arts degree from the University of Puerto Rico in 1942. He received a Bachelor of Laws from the University of Puerto Rico School of Law in 1948. He was a member of Phi Sigma Alpha fraternity. He served as a Sergeant in the United States Army from 1944 to 1946 and after his discharge became a vocational advisor and psychometriest with the Veterans Administration in San Juan, Puerto Rico from 1946 to 1947. He was a trial examiner for the Puerto Rico Labor Relations Board in San Juan in 1948. He was Chief of the Legal Division of the Puerto Rico Labor Relations Board in San Juan from 1949 to 1952. He was Chairman of the Wage and Hours Commission under the Fair Labor Standards Act for the United States Department of Labor from 1952 to 1958. He was Director of the Labor Relations Institute at the University of Puerto Rico from 1952 to 1955. He was Dean of Administration at the University of Puerto Rico from 1955 to 1959. He was a Professor of Labor Relations and Labor Law at the University of Puerto Rico from 1952 to 1965. He was Commonwealth Attorney General of Puerto Rico from 1959 to 1962. He was Commonwealth Secretary of Justice of Puerto Rico from 1962 to 1965.

Federal judicial service

Cancio served as a District Judge of the United States District Court for the District of Puerto Rico, then an Article IV territorial court, from 1965 to 1967, appointed to a term of eight years.

In 1966, the United States Congress passed an act reorganizing the United States District Court for the District of Puerto Rico as an Article III court, with the judges thereof having life tenure and salary protection. Cancio was nominated by President Lyndon B. Johnson on January 16, 1967, to the United States District Court for the District of Puerto Rico, to a new seat authorized by 80 Stat. 764. He was confirmed by the United States Senate on June 12, 1967, and received his commission on June 12, 1967. He served as Chief Judge from 1967 to 1974. His service terminated on January 31, 1974, due to his resignation.

Post judicial service and death

After his resignation from the federal bench, Cancio engaged in the private practice of law. He died on December 16, 2008.

See also
List of Hispanic/Latino American jurists

References

Sources
 
 
 Guillermo A. Baralt, History of the Federal Court in Puerto Rico: 1899-1999 (2004) (also published in Spanish as Historia del Tribunal Federal de Puerto Rico)

1920 births
2008 deaths
People from San Sebastián, Puerto Rico
University of Puerto Rico alumni
University of Puerto Rico faculty
Hispanic and Latino American judges
Judges of the United States District Court for the District of Puerto Rico
United States Army soldiers
United States federal judges appointed by Lyndon B. Johnson
20th-century American judges